"The Vengeful One" is a song by heavy metal band Disturbed, from their sixth album Immortalized. It was released on June 23, 2015, and is the band's first released song in 4 years, since the release of The Lost Children. The song is featured as the background music in the opening for Ferrall on the Bench, Scott Ferrall's CBS Sports Radio show.

Accolades

Loudwire Music Awards

|-
| 2015 || rowspan="2"| The Vengeful One || Best Rock Song || 
|-
| 2015 || Best Rock Video ||

Track listing

Music video 
The animated, rotoscoping-heavy music video was directed by Phil Mucci and released on YouTube on June 23. It features the band's mascot The Guy, as "The Vengeful One" and "The Dark Messiah" embarking on a destructive crusade against hyperbolic representations of corruption and cultural toxicity in modern news media.

The video opens with The Guy monitoring television broadcasts from a void in deep space. Television screens depict war and destruction and flash the words like "HATE", "FEAR", and "OBEY"; while news broadcasts show combined line and bar graphs with the words "DEATH TOLL / STOCKS SOAR" and "POVERTY / PROFITS" delivered by cheery anchors. Fed up with what he sees, The Guy embarks toward the source of the violent broadcasts to stop them, discovering a towering building on the edge of a city labeled Global Warfare Manufacturing. The building is surrounded by ruins and vehicles in a desert, with decaying ships indicating the presence of a dried-up ocean. Inside, the news anchors are revealed to be robotic puppets, all media is controlled by a single businessman, and broadcast from a central location. The Guy destroys all the robotic anchors and proceeds to the Master Control room where he finds feral demonic workers cannibalizing an intern named Hope. The Guy kills the demonic workers, with the final demonic businessman being thrown out a window into a passing helicopter. Over the course of the video, a family is depicted watching television news and violent cartoons and changing into the same feral demons that were in the master control room. The Guy removes the large spherical camera rig from the center of the room and throws it into the sun, and destroys Global Warfare MFG's satellites as he departs. With the violent broadcasts stopped, the family returns to human form and appears to be at peace once again.

Personnel 
Disturbed
 Dan Donegan – lead and rhythm guitar, bass guitar, EBow, keyboards, backing vocals
 David Draiman – lead and backing vocals
 Mike Wengren – drums, percussion, backing vocals

Production
 Kevin Churko – engineer, mixing, producer
 Samantha Maloney – orchestral arrangement

Charts

Weekly charts

Year-end charts

In popular culture
The Vengeful One was released as a downloadable content for the video game, Rock Band 4, on January 12, 2016.

References 

2015 singles
Disturbed (band) songs
2015 songs
Reprise Records singles
Song recordings produced by Kevin Churko
Songs about revenge
Songs written by Dan Donegan
Songs written by David Draiman
Songs written by Mike Wengren
Songs written by Kevin Churko
Songs about the media
Animated music videos